Year 1383 (MCCCLXXXIII) was a common year starting on Thursday (link will display the full calendar) of the Julian calendar.

Events 
 January–December 
 May 17 – King John I of Castile and Leon marries Beatrice of Portugal. 
 July 7 – The childless James of Baux, ruler of Taranto and Achaea, and last titular Latin Emperor, dies. As a result:
 Charles III of Naples becomes ruler of Achaea (now southern Greece). 
 Otto, Duke of Brunswick-Grubenhagen, the widower of Joanna I of Naples, becomes ruler of Taranto (now eastern Italy). 
 Louis I, Duke of Anjou inherits the claim to the Latin Empire (now western Turkey), but never uses the title of Emperor.
 October 22 – King Fernando I of Portugal dies, and is succeeded by his daughter, Beatrice of Portugal. A period of civil war and anarchy, known as the 1383–85 Crisis, begins in Portugal, due to Beatrice being married to King John I of Castile and Leon.

 Date unknown 
 Dan I succeeds his father as Prince of Wallachia. He is the ancestor of the House of Dăneşti.
 The Teutonic Knights recommence war against pagan Lithuania.
 Rao Chanda succeeds Rao Biram Dev, as Rathore ruler of Marwar (now in western India).
 Löwenbräu beer is first brewed.
 Completion of the original inner courtyard of Farleigh Hungerford Castle in Somersetshire, England.
 The Wat Phra That Doi Suthep Temple is built in present-day Thailand, by King Kuena of Lanna.
 Construction of the Bastille is completed in Paris, France.

Births 
 April 30 – Anne of Gloucester, English countess, granddaughter of King Edward III of England (d. 1438)
 September 4 – Antipope Felix V (d. 1451)
 November 9 – Niccolò III d'Este, Marquis of Ferrara (d. 1441)
 date unknown
 Pope Eugene IV (d. 1447)
 Amadeus VIII, Duke of Savoy (d. 1451)

Deaths 
 March 1 – Amadeus VI, Count of Savoy (b. 1334)
 March 3 – Hugh III of Arborea
 June 5 – Dmitry Konstantinovich, Russian prince (b. 1324)
 June 8 – Thomas de Ros, 4th Baron de Ros, English Crusader (b. 1338)
 June 15 – John VI Kantakouzenos, Byzantine Emperor (b. 1292)
 July 7   James of Baux, titular Latin Emperor
 October 22 – King Fernando I of Portugal (b. 1345)
 December 7 – Wenceslaus I, Duke of Luxembourg (b. 1337)
 December 23 – Beatrice of Bourbon, Queen of Bohemia (b. 1320)
 date unknown
 Radu I, Prince of Wallachia

References